The American Canoe Association (ACA) is the oldest and largest paddle sports organization in the United States, promoting canoeing, kayaking, and rafting. The ACA sponsors more than seven hundred events each year, along with safety education, instructor certification, waterway conservation and public information campaigns. There are more than four thousand ACA certified canoe and kayak instructors. More than two hundred local paddling clubs and fifty thousand individuals are members.  The Association publishes the bi-monthly Paddler Magazine.

History
The ACA was founded in 1880 by Scottish lawyer, John MacGregor, who had founded the British Royal Canoe Club (RCC) in 1866. The site of Neide and Kendall's launch and the formation of the American Canoe Association is located on the grounds of the Wiawaka Holiday House. In 1886 the ACA and the RCC held the first international canoe sailing regatta.

The Adirondack Museum in Blue Mountain, New York has many artifacts from the early years of the ACA.

References
 American Canoe Association
 Full text of Charles Neide's account of the New York to Florida canoe trip, 1882
 ACA Courses offered by the Hulbert Outdoor Center

External links
 American Canoe Association
 Paddler Magazine
 Wiawaka Official Site

Canoeing and kayaking organizations
National members of the Pan American Canoe Federation
Sports organizations established in 1880
Canoeing in the United States
1880 establishments in the United States